Söding-Sankt Johann is since 2015 a municipality with 4,043 residents (as of 1 January 2016) in Voitsberg District in Styria, Austria.

The municipality Söding-Sankt Johann was created as part of the Styria municipal structural reform,
at the end of 2014, by merging the former towns Söding and Sankt Johann-Köppling.

Geography 
Söding-Sankt Johann lies southwest of Graz.

Municipality arrangement 
The municipality territory includes the following 10 sections (population as of 1 January 2016):
 Großsöding (672)
 Hallersdorf (256)
 Hausdorf (128)
 Kleinsöding (1,000)
 Köppling (504)
 Moosing (260)
 Muggauberg (192)
 Neudorf bei Sankt Johann ob Hohenburg (119)
 Pichling bei Mooskirchen (518)
 Sankt Johann ob Hohenburg (393)

The municipality consists of the  Katastralgemeinden Großsöding, Hallersdorf, Hausdorf, Kleinsöding, Köppling, Moosing, Neudorf bei St. Johann, Pichling bei Mooskirchen and St. Johann ob Hohenburg.

References

Cities and towns in Voitsberg District